Cockspurn thorn is a common name for several plants and may refer to:
Crataegus crus-galli, a species of hawthorn native to eastern North America.
Crataegus succulenta, round-fruited cockspur thorn
Maclura cochinchinensis, a species of vine or scrambling shrub in the family Moraceae, native to eastern Asia and Australia.